The 1968 Dutch Open was a combined men's and women's tennis tournament staged at 't Melkhuisje in Hilversum, Netherlands. The tournament was played on outdoor clay courts and was held from 22 July to 28 July 1968. It was the 12th edition of the tournament and the first in the Open era of tennis. Bob Maud and Margaret Smith won the singles titles.

Finals

Men's singles
 Bob Maud defeated  István Gulyás 7–9, 7–5, 6–0, 1–6, 13–11

Women's singles
 Margaret Court defeated  Judy Tegart 8–6, 6–0

Men's doubles
 Jan Kodeš /  Jan Kukal defeated  Ingo Buding /  Harald Elschenbroich 6–3, 6–1

Women's doubles

 Annette Du Plooy /  Pat Walkden defeated  Judy Tegart /  Astrid Suurbeek 6–2, 3–6, 6–3

Mixed doubles
 Annette Du Plooy /  Bob Maud defeated  Margaret Court /  Tom Okker two sets

References

External links
 ITF tournament edition details

Dutch Open (tennis)
Dutch Open
Dutch Open
Dutch Open (tennis), 1968